Address Unknown is a 1944 American film noir drama film directed by William Cameron Menzies based on Kressmann Taylor's novel Address Unknown (1938). The film tells the story of two families caught up in the rise of Nazism in Germany before the start of World War II.

Cinematographer Rudolph Maté employed shadows, shapes and camera angles to create the imagery. One notable scene shows Martin Schulz (Paul Lukas) descending a staircase awaiting his arrest by the Gestapo, with the shadow of a web-like criss-cross of window panes behind him.

Plot
Martin Schulz and Max Eisenstein (Morris Carnovsky) are good friends, German expatriate art dealers living in the United States. Martin's son Heinrich (Peter van Eyck) and Max's daughter Griselle (K.T. Stevens) are in love. When Martin and his wife return to Germany to find artwork, Griselle accompanies them to seek acting opportunities.

Martin meets Baron von Freische (Carl Esmond), joins the Nazi Party and becomes an important government official. Martin eventually insists that Max stop writing to him as Max is a Jew. When Max sends him a hand-delivered letter to confirm he is not acting under duress, Martin makes it clear they are no longer friends.

Griselle has been acting in Vienna under the stage name Stone when she lands the leading role in a play in Berlin. Before the premiere, the censor (Charles Halton) insists certain lines be cut (such as "Blessed are the peacemakers ...") as contrary to Nazi doctrine. On opening night, however, Griselle speaks the lines anyway. When the incensed censor makes her reveal her real name, it causes the antisemitic crowd to riot. The play's director hurries a still-defiant Griselle out of the theatre for her own safety.

Finally realising her danger, she seeks help from Martin at his country estate, but he shuts the front door in her face. Several gunshots are heard. Martin's wife, Elsa (Mady Christians), is appalled by her husband's heartlessness. Max and Heinrich learn of Griselle's death in a short letter in which Martin states only that she is dead.

Martin receives a telegram informing him that Max will resume writing to him and that Martin will understand his messages. Martin finds Max's first letter incomprehensible, as it seems to be in code. Martin is warned that receiving coded messages is illegal. When letters continue to arrive, Martin is forced to resign his party position.

Elsa decides to take their children to Switzerland. Martin sends with her a letter appealing to Max to stop writing to him. The border guards see the letter, so Elsa destroys it before they can read it, raising suspicions further. Von Freische demands that Martin name his associates. When Martin persists in proclaiming his innocence, von Freische tells him that the Gestapo will question him. Martin is terrified. He considers suicide, but that night, he leaves his mansion by the front door. Immediately, he is illuminated by a flashlight.

Back in San Francisco, a letter addressed to Martin is returned stamped "Address Unknown". A puzzled Max tells Heinrich that he had not resumed writing to his father. The reaction on Heinrich's face indicates that it was he who sent the letters.

Cast
 Paul Lukas as Martin Schulz
 Carl Esmond as Baron von Freische
 Peter van Eyck as Heinrich Schulz (as Peter Van Eyck)
 Mady Christians as Elsa Schultz
 Morris Carnovsky as Max Eisenstein
 K.T. Stevens as Griselle Eisenstein aka Griselle Stone
 Emory Parnell as Postman
 Mary Young as Mrs. Delaney
 Frank Faylen as Jimmie Blake
 Charles Halton as Censorial Pipsqueak
 Erwin Kalser as Stage Director
 Frank Reicher as Professor Schmidt
 Dale Cornell as Carl Schulz
 Peter Newmeyer as Wilhelm Schulz
 Larry Olsen as Schulz Boy (as Larry Joe Olsen)
 Gary Gray as Hugo Schulz

Academy Award nominations
Morris Stoloff and Ernst Toch were nominated for the Academy Award for Best Original Score, and Lionel Banks, Walter Holscher and Joseph Kish were nominated for Best Art Direction.

References

External links
 
 
 
 

1944 films
1944 drama films
American black-and-white films
American drama films
Columbia Pictures films
1940s English-language films
Films about Nazi Germany
Films based on American novels
Films directed by William Cameron Menzies
Films scored by Ernst Toch
Films scored by Morris Stoloff
Films set in Germany
Films set in the 1930s
1940s American films